La Terra ("The Earth") is the second studio album by Italian world music pioneers Aktuala. It was released on Bla Bla records in 1974.  The cover features a medieval map of the world as it was known surrounded by the "world ocean".  There are fewer, longer pieces than on the first record and they feature extended jams. Maioli writes that it was representative of the music played by the core group of Maioli, Cavallanti and Cerantola for two years; rehearsing and jamming in restaurants and psych wards until they got the perfect sound, and that it features the influences but not the performances of many of the other musicians who performed with them over that time.  It is the first recording of master world percussionist Trilok Gurtu, who had to leave Italy shortly after the recording because of work visa expiry.

Musicians
 Walter Maioli: Arabic oboe, wooden flute, naj, bass flute, maranzano, bass harmonica, reeds, whistles, bells
 Daniele Cavallanti: soprano saxophone
 Antonio Cerantola: acoustic guitar, balalaika
 Lino "Capra" Vaccina: Moroccan bongos, koborò, African drums, tabla, gong, xylophone, whistles, cymbals, musical bow, percussion
 Otto Corrado: soprano saxophone, flute, bells
 Attilio Zanchi: acoustic guitar
 Marjon Klok: harp, tamboura, bells
 Trilok Gurtu: tabla, snake drums, Moroccan bongos, cymbals, xylophone, cow bells
With guests
 Marino Vismara: cello solo on Mud
 Maurizio Dones: viola solo on Sar

Track listing
 Mina
 Mud
 Sar
 La terra

References

External links 
 Page at italianprog.com
 Walter Maioli's page about Aktuala featuring La Terra
 Prog archives page with reviews and album art

1974 albums
Aktuala albums
Trilok Gurtu albums